HD 115004 is a single star in the northern constellation of Canes Venatici. It is faintly visible to the naked eye with an apparent visual magnitude of 4.94. The star is moving closer with a heliocentric radial velocity of −22 km/s.

The suffix notation indicates a mild overabundance of the CN molecule in the stellar atmosphere. It has an estimated 3.2 times the mass of the Sun and, at the age of 440 million years, has expanded to 23 times the Sun's radius. The star is radiating around 242 times the Sun's luminosity from its enlarged photosphere at an effective temperature of 4,761 K.

References

G-type giants
Canes Venatici
Durchmusterung objects
115004
065450
4997